No Home of the Mind is the third studio album by American ensemble Bing & Ruth. It was released in February 2017 under 4AD.

Track listing

References

2017 albums
4AD albums